A constitutional referendum was held in Yemen on 20 February 2001. The amendments to the constitution were reportedly approved by 77.2% of voters, with a 65.1% turnout.

Results

References

2001 referendums
2001 in Yemen
2001
Constitutional referendums